Wentworth Park is a park near the suburbs of Glebe and Ultimo in Sydney, New South Wales, Australia.

The park contains several muti-purpose sporting pitches, cricket nets and a number of fitness installations. There is a playground in the southern area of the park and seating for picnics. Public toilets are next to the sports field.

In the centre of the park is the Wentworth Park Sporting Complex.

History
Wentworth Park was initially a creek and swamp, known from the 1830s as Blackwattle Cove Swamp. Between the 1830s and 1860s, various toxic industries were established along the shore, including, in particular, abattoirs and boiling down works. The pollution from these works befouled the swamp so that, even after the removal of these establishments from the area, the local council lobbied to have the area in-filled because of the stench that continued to arise from the water and mud.

Infilling of the creek and head of the swamp commenced in 1876 and continued until 1880. Silt dredged from the Sydney Harbour was used to carry out the process and numerous sea walls and dykes were constructed as part of the program. When the area was filled, trustees were appointed to manage the new park and a competition was announced to design the new facility. After numerous complaints regarding the management of the competition, the construction commenced and by 1882 opinion had turned favourably to the new ovals, greens, paths, lakes and other facilities offered in the park, named in honour of William Wentworth.

Throughout the 1880s and 1890s, the park came to serve as a focus for community activities including concerts, celebrations, moving pictures and in particular the home of Glebe Dirty Reds and sport in general. During the 1910 Great Britain Lions tour of Australia and New Zealand, an Australasian team defeated Great Britain at the ground before a crowd of approximately 15,000.

The commencement of hostilities for World War I led to a downturn in patronage of the park's amenities although community functions, such as stretcher drills and polling were carried out here. The main effect of World War I was the introduction of a large number of timber sheds used to store wool for the war effort. These sheds lingered on at the park for a number of years after the war.

As a sporting venue 
Wentworth Park was originally a rugby league sports ground in the Glebe area, the home ground of the Glebe Dirty Reds who were a part of the New South Wales Rugby League premiership at the time of the competition's inception. The ground was also home to Annandale rugby league team throughout their existence from 1910 to 1920. After the Glebe Dirty Reds were removed from the competition at the end of 1929, Balmain Tigers continued to play some of their home matches at the ground. The final game of first grade rugby league played at Wentworth Park was in Round 2, 1931 when the Balmain Tigers played against University with Balmain Tigers winning 29–14. A question over the use of league or grounds gatemen led the League to decide to use other grounds.

From 1928 until 1936, Wentworth Park was also used as a speedway and was known as Wentworth Speedway. The first racing took place on 21 April 1928 and continued until 28 November 1936. Motorcycle speedway was the first category to use the venue, with competitors including future Speedway World Champions Lionel Van Praag and Bluey Wilkinson. Wentworth Park was the site of Sydney's first ever Speedcar race on 5 October 1935. The final speedway meeting was to have taken place on 5 December 1936, but track damage and noise complaints saw the meeting cancelled.

During July 1938 the government granted a second greyhound racing licence (consisting of 26 fixtures) for Wentworth Park. Although the licence was granted in July 1938 it was not until Saturday 28 October 1939 that the new track opened. The opening had been delayed due to the construction of the track taking longer than expected.

Sporting Complex

Wentworth Park Sporting Complex is a multi-purpose sporting facility Over the years, the facility has been used for various sports including soccer, rugby union, rugby league, greyhound racing, and speedway.

Greyhound racing is conducted at Wentworth Park on Wednesday and Saturday nights as well as some special events. The track is a sand surface having been converted from grass in the 1990s. Hurdle racing was a feature of Wentworth Park until the early 1980s. It fell away and annual events were held in December for a number of years until the mid-1990s.

The nearby University of Technology, Sydney and other educational facilities regularly hold student examinations within two levels of the grandstand.

Tenants to the Wentworth Park complex include Janison Exam Management (formerly Language Testing Consultants (LTC)) and The New South Wales Greyhound Breeders, Owners and Trainers Association (NSW GBOTA).

The infield oval is used by local schools as well other community sporting groups for sporting events.

Since the 1980s, The New South Wales Greyhound Owners Breeders and Trainers Association (NSW GBOTA) has been the primary tenant of Wentworth Park (previously sharing with the now defunct NSW National Coursing Association Club). Greyhound racing is held at the venue every Wednesday and Saturday nights from 7.30pm. The biggest event of the year at Wentworth Park is the Group 1 Golden Easter Egg which provides prize money of 1,000,000 across the Easter carnival. The Carnival attracts approximately 25,000 racegoers. The final night is held annually on Easter Saturday.

Wentworth Park is also the home ground of semi-professional association football club Balmain Tigers FC who play in the NSW State League Division 1, the third division of football in New South Wales.

On 5 January 2018, it was announced that the Glebe Dirty Reds would return to Wentworth Park to play pre-season games which would be the first time that rugby league has been played there in 90 years.  The matches also featured The Newtown Jets and The Blacktown Workers Sea Eagles. On 17 February 2019, the Glebe Dirty Reds played in a pre-season trial game against the North Sydney Bears at Wentworth Park; and won, 24–12.  This was the first time the two clubs had met since 1929. The day also featured two other matches with the Newtown Jets playing against the North Sydney Intrust Super Premiership NSW side and Ryde-Eastwood against Sydney University rugby league team.

See also

Glebe and Wentworth Park railway viaducts
List of parks in Sydney

References

External links

 
  [CC-By-SA]

Rugby league stadiums in Australia
Greyhound racing venues in Australia
Balmain Tigers
Greyhound racing in Australia
Soccer venues in Sydney
Glebe, New South Wales
Parks in Sydney